Adam Fidusiewicz (born 18 February 1985 in Warszawa, Poland) is a Polish actor.

Studies
 2009-2014: The Aleksander Zelwerowicz National Academy of Dramatic Art in Warsaw
 2004-2009: University of Social Science and Humanities

Filmography
 2019: Wypad as a rich kid   
 2018: Łowcy as a dancer
 2015: Bodo as Hans in the TVP series directed by Michał Kwieciński
 2015: Crossing Lines as Artur Slomski in the TV series directed by Susan Tully
 2015: Ojciec Mateusz as Marek in the TVP series directed by Wojciech Nowak
 2015: O mnie się nie martw as Robert in the TVP2 series directed by Filip Zylber
 2014: Passing Bells as German corporal in the TVP series
 2014: Czas Honoru: Powstanie as Wolf in the TVP2 series
 2014: Zobacz mnie – directed by Mateusz Michalski
 2014: Sailor's Tales as Coach in the film directed by Marcin Latałło
 2013: Bastian as Bastian in the film directed by Szymon Kubka
 2011: Na dobre i na złe (episode 462 "Dymisja" and episode 480 "Trudne decyzje") as young hacker Pilecki 'Pisklak'
 2008: Małgosia contra Małgosia as Krzysiek
 2003–2015: Na Wspólnej as Maks Brzozowski
 2001: In Desert and Wilderness as Staś Tarkowski in the film directed by Gavin Hood
 1996: Likwidator as young boy in the mini series by Krzysztof Janczak
 1995: Różany Zamek as Promyk in TV Theatre by Wojciech Molski

Theatre 
 2013: Scenariusz dla trzech aktorów Bogusława Schaeffera – as Dru (directed by Paweł Paszta, A Tu Theatre)
 2013: Porwanie Sabinek Juliana Tuwima – as Emil (directed by Emilian Kamiński, Teatr Kamienica in Warsaw)
 2013: Piosennik Program składany Andrzeja Poniedzielskiego – as poKosynier (directed by Andrzej Poniedzielski, Ateneum Theatre)
 2013: Harce młodzieży polskiej Tomasza Śpiewaka – as scout Adam (directed by Remigiusz Brzyk, Teatr IMKA in Warsaw)
 2012: MP4 (directed by Mariusz Benoit, Teatr Powszechny im. Zygmunta Hübnera w Warszawie)
 2012: Wesele Stanisław Wyspiański – as Kasper and Widmo (directed by Jarosław Gajewski, Teatr Collegium Nobilium in Warsaw)
 2012: Warsztat - directed by Katarzyna Małachowska in Teatr Collegium Nobilium in Warsaw
 2012: Juliett must die based on  William Shakespeare's Romeo and Juliet – as Romeo (directed by Barbara Wiśniewska, The Aleksander Zelwerowicz National Academy of Dramatic Art in Warsaw). In October 2012 the play took part in Baltic House Theatre Festival in Petersburg, in February 2013 the play took part in SZEM Festival in Miskolc (Hungary), then the play was being shown in The International Theatre Schools Festival  ITSELF in Warsaw, and in 56th Festival dei 2 Mondi di Spoleto in Italy.
 2011: Pielgrzymi do Grobu Pańskiego by Johann Adolph Hasse – as Guide (directed by Aneta Groszyńska, Kamila Michalak, Jakub Kasprzak, Tomasz Szczepanek, under an eye of Ryszard Peryt, Teatr Collegium Nobilium in Warsaw)
 2010: Enter – choreography preparation for the play (directed by Anna Smolar and Jacek Poniedziałek, Nowy Teatr in Warsaw)
 2004: Musical Romeo and Julia Bartosz Wierzbięta based on William Shakespeare's Romeo and Juliet  – as Parys (directed by Janusz Józefowicz, music by Janusz Stokłosa, Teatr Studio Buffo in Warsaw)
 2000: Musical Metro Agata i Maryna Miklaszewska – as young man (directed by Janusz Józefowicz, music by Janusz Stokłosa, Teatr Studio Buffo in Warsaw)
 1999: Piotruś Pan by J. M. Barrie in an adaptation by Jeremi Przybora – as Indian (directed by Janusz Józefowicz, music by Janusz Stokłosa, Teatr Muzyczny Roma in Warsaw)

Dubbing 
 2015: Avengers: Age of Ultron
 2015: Ant Man
 2015 Scooby-Doo! and Kiss: Rock and Roll Mystery - Demon
 2015 Cinderella
 2014: Big Hero 6
 2014: Totally Spies! The Movie
 2014: Syn Boży
 2014: Captain America: The Winter Soldier
 2014: Muppets Most Wanted
 2014: Swindle – Darren Vader
 2014: Pokémon – N
 2013: Doraemon
 2013: Packages from Planet X
 2013: The Wizards Return: Alex vs. Alex – Dominic
 2012: Leonardo – Michelangelo di Lodovico Buonarroti Simoni (episode 8)
 2012: Gravity Falls
 2012: Young Justice –
 Thomas Kalmaku (odc. 33),
 Kapitan Cold (odc. 34),
 Static/Virgil Hawkins (odc. 40, 43, 46)
 2011: Kickin' It –
 Shane (odc. 58, 68),
 Frank (odc. 67),
 Matt (odc. 73)
 2010: Ben & Holly's Little Kingdom

References

External links
 Official homepage of Adam Fidusiewicz
 



1985 births
Living people
Male actors from Warsaw
Polish male film actors
Polish male stage actors
Polish male voice actors
Polish male television actors
Polish male child actors
21st-century Polish male actors